Puerperal may refer to:

Puerperal (childbed) fever, a fever caused by uterine infection following childbirth or miscarriage
Puerperal disorder, a childbirth-related women's illness
Puerperal mastitis, an infection related to having children in women
Puerperal bipolar disorder, a postpartum anxiety maker
Puerperal endometritis, an outer uterine inflammation